Hekelingen is a village in the Dutch province of South Holland. It is located immediately to the south of Spijkenisse.

From 1812 to 1817, Hekelingen was part of Spijkenisse. It was a separate municipality from 1817 until 1 January 1966, when it merged with Spijkenisse.

References

Populated places in South Holland
Former municipalities of South Holland
Nissewaard